Courtney A. Milburn, (born January 18, 1986) better known by his stage name Chedda Da Connect, is an American hip hop recording artist from Houston, Texas. He is best known for his 2015 single "Flicka Da Wrist" which was one of the biggest hip-hop singles of 2015. As of September 2015, the single has been certified Gold selling over 500,000 downloads, spawned over a million memes and vine compilations, and has accumulated over 6 million YouTube views in 6 months, since being uploaded to YouTube in May 2015. It peaked at number 94 on the US Billboard Hot 100 on 29, May 2015.

Career
In 2015, Chedda Da Connect's single "Flicka Da Wrist" which went viral online. The single, which was released March 3, 2015, has been remixed by numerous rap artists such as Fetty Wap, 2 Chainz, Migos, Soulja Boy, T.I., Rick Ross, Kevin Gates and many more. The song became a popular meme on Vine, with characters such as Spider-Man and Squidward (from 'SpongeBob SquarePants') "dancing" to the song in short clips. It has been supported on social media by numerous celebries; Tyga posted a Snapchat of he and Justin Bieber dancing to it at Rihanna's Met Ball party in May, Rihanna herself uploaded a video vine singing the song and doing the songs dance, LeBron James and his Cleveland Cavaliers who in a YouTube video was seen celebrating after a win to the song, Justin Bieber who uploaded a video of himself cooking to the song, and Drake taught his mother how to do the "Flicka Da Wrist" dance. The song entered the Billboard chart's weeks after gaining online popularity, largely on the strength of its streaming activity and digital download sales. An official "Flicka Da Wrist Remix" was released in June 2015 and featured Fetty Wap, Boosie Badazz, Yo Gotti and Boston George.

Chedda Da Connect signed with eOne Entertainment. He also started the record label We Run It Entertainment, signing himself and fellow Houston rappers T-Wayne and Don Toliver.

Projects

Chedda Da Connect released a mixtape called 'Chedda World' in May 2015. The mixtape features appearances from T-Wayne, Kirko Bangz and more, with production from Zaytoven, Sy Ari Da Kid, and Fred On Em.

Discography

Albums
Chedda World (2014)
Catchin' Playz (2014)
Catchin' Playz 2 (2014)
Chedda World: The Album (2015)

Singles

References

Living people
African-American male rappers
American male rappers
Rappers from Houston
Southern hip hop musicians
1986 births
21st-century American rappers
21st-century American male musicians
21st-century African-American musicians
20th-century African-American people